Max Lynar Louden (1869-?) was a bigamist, and confidence man, and a spy for Germany during World War I.

Biography
He was born in 1869 as Max Scheimangk in Staupitz, Imperial Germany. He studied at a military academy but never graduated. He then migrated to the United States in 1890.

He at first passed himself off as Max de Chimang in Poughkeepsie, New York where he organized a Schützenbund and fled with the money he collected from a charity event.

On August 29, 1911 he got his license to marry Lalia Florence Allendorf.

In 1915 he was convicted of bigamy and sentenced to Sing Sing.

Aliases
 Count Jean Marcel Peyrgne de Passy
 Count Albert Marcel de Passy
 Count Rocher M. zu Lynar
 Count Max Lynar Louden
 Count De Passy
 Max de Chimang

References

People convicted of bigamy
World War I spies for Germany
German emigrants to the United States
1869 births
Year of death missing